Narga Selassie is an Orthodox Tewahedo church on the western shores of Dek Island, the largest island of Lake Tana in northern Ethiopia. The name signifies "Trinity of the Rest". "Rest" refers to the place and the shade thereabouts.

The church was constructed by Empress Mentewab in the late 18th century, apparently using as construction material for doors and roof a gigantic sycamore fig tree that stood at the centre of a slight elevation, now the centre of the church. Narga Selassie is fully decorated in the local style. A relief on the main entry portrays the Scottish explorer James Bruce, who visited the capital, Gondar, in the late 18th century.

Narga Selassie was constructed in the classic round architectural tradition of the churches in the Lake Tana area, with the usage of stone both in the peristylium around the church and in the compound walls. 

The church is accessed from the lake through a port constructed in 1987, which is connected to Bahir Dar and Gorgora by a state-owned ferry service. The access is in itself a beauty spot with a huge sycamore with long aerial roots descending to the lake and a door tower which forms part of the original construction.

References
 James Bruce, Travels to Discover the Source of the Nile, In the Years 1768, 1769, 1770, 1771, 1772 and 1773

Further reading
 Mario Di Salvo, Stanislaw Chojnacki and Osvaldo Raineri, Churches of Ethiopia - The Monastery of Narga Selasse (Milan: Skira Editore, 1999) 

18th-century Oriental Orthodox church buildings
Churches in Ethiopia
Lake Tana
18th-century churches in Ethiopia
Ethiopian Orthodox Tewahedo church buildings